The White River is a  tributary of the Salt River in the U.S. state of Arizona. Formed by two forks that drain part of the White Mountains, it begins in Navajo County and ends in Gila County, where it meets the Black River to form the Salt River.

The White River lies entirely within the Fort Apache Indian Reservation in the east-central part of the state. The North Fork White River and the East Fork White River merge near Fort Apache to form the main stem, which continues generally southwest to its confluence with the Black River.

Originating near the Mogollon Rim, the North Fork flows generally west through Apache County to near McNary and then south through Navajo County to near Fort Apache. The East Fork flows generally west from near Mount Baldy in Apache County to the confluence with the North Fork near Fort Apache.

According to Arizona Place Names, the river and its forks take their name from the White Mountains, "as nearly as can be determined". The origin of name of the mountains is "probably lost", but "White Mountains" was used by the state's governor in a speech in 1871. An earlier Spanish-language alternative name for the stream was Sierra Blanca River.

See also
 List of rivers of Arizona

References

Rivers of Arizona
Rivers of Navajo County, Arizona
Rivers of Gila County, Arizona
White Mountains (Arizona)
Tributaries of the Salt River (Arizona)